Swans Are Dead is the fifth double  and seventh overall live album by American experimental rock band Swans. It was released in 1998 and was recorded in 1995 and 1997 on the band's final tours, before reuniting in 2010.

The setlists of this era in the Swans live show were probably the most varied in terms of chronology. Although many of the songs performed were taken from Soundtracks for the Blind, the band also resurrected songs from much earlier albums, including a re-worked version of "I Crawled" from the Young God EP (1984).

Background
Disc one (Black) was recorded in Amsterdam, New York City, Trondheim, Prague, Brussels and Atlanta on the band's final tour in 1997. Two other songs were performed on this tour, "The Man With the Silver Tongue", which appeared in a revised form on Angels of Light's 1999 debut LP New Mother; and "My Birth", which remained unreleased until it appeared on Swans's 2010 album My Father Will Guide Me up a Rope to the Sky. However, neither tracks were included on the album. Other songs were also sporadically performed, such as "The Sound" (at least twice on the American leg of the tour).

The liner notes state that disc two (white) was recorded in Norway on the band's 1995 tour. The songs "In", "Alcohol the Seed", and "Animus", that had been played during the tour and also for the Amsterdam concert, did not appear on Swans Are Dead (the concert has been recorded by the radio station VPRO, Animus is also cut on that recording).

Critical reception

The Rough Guide to Rock described the album as "a head-churning final statement".

Track listing

Personnel 
Credits for Swans Are Dead adapted from liner notes.

Disc one (Black)
 Michael Gira - vocals, guitar, compiling, mastering, producer, lyrics, music
 Jarboe - vocals, keyboards
 Bill Bronson - bass guitar
 Clinton Steele - guitar
 Phil Puleo - percussion, dulcimer (hammer)
 Dave Ouimet - performer
 Kris Force - performer
 Berry Kamer - recording 
 Josh Wertheimer - live engineer, recording
 Chris Griffin - engineer

Disc two (White)
 Michael Gira - vocals, guitar, compiling, mastering, producer, lyrics, music
 Jarboe - vocals, keyboards
 Joe Goldring - bass guitar, guitar
 Vudi - guitar, keyboards
 Larry Mullins - percussion, vibraphone
 Andy Ray - live engineer
 Chris Griffin - engineer

References

1998 live albums
Swans (band) live albums
Young God Records live albums
Albums produced by Michael Gira